Roberto Wong Ordeñana (born August 17, 1979 in Costa Rica) is a Costa Rican footballer, who plays at defender at Puntarenas.

His last name in Chinese is 黄, which means "yellow", and his ancestor was from Zhanjiang, Guangdong, China.

Club career
Wong started his career at Herediano and played for Santos de Guápiles before starting a lengthy stint at hometown club Puntarenas. He moved to Liberia Mía in 2009 and had a spell at ambitious club Barrio México before joining Saprissa from them on loan. In May 2011 he was deemed surplus to requirements by the club so he signed for a year with Pérez Zeledón, but returned to Puntarenas in 2012.

International career
Wong made his senior debut for Costa Rica in a February 2007 UNCAF Nations Cup match against Panama and earned his second and final cap in an October 2007 friendly against Haiti.

References

External links 
 2010-13 career stats Nacion.com

1979 births
Living people
Costa Rican people of Chinese descent
People from Puntarenas
Association football defenders
Costa Rican footballers
Costa Rica international footballers
Copa Centroamericana-winning players
C.S. Herediano footballers
Santos de Guápiles footballers
Puntarenas F.C. players
Municipal Liberia footballers
Deportivo Saprissa players
Municipal Pérez Zeledón footballers